The 2018 Chattanooga Mocs football team represented the University of Tennessee at Chattanooga in the 2018 NCAA Division I FCS football season as a member of the Southern Conference (SoCon). The Mocs were led by second-year head coach Tom Arth and played their home games at Finley Stadium in Chattanooga, Tennessee. They finished the season 6–5 overall and 4–4 in SoCon play to place in a three-way tie for fifth.

On December 14, head coach Arth resigned to become the head coach at Akron. He finished at Chattanooga with a two-year record of 9–13.

Previous season
The Mocs finished the 2017 season 3–8, 3–5 in SoCon play to finish in a tie for sixth place.

Preseason

Preseason media poll
The SoCon released their preseason media poll on July 25, 2018, with the Mocs predicted to finish in sixth place. The same day the coaches released their preseason poll with the Mocs predicted to finish in fifth place.

Preseason All-SoCon Teams
The Mocs placed six players on the preseason all-SoCon teams.

Offense

2nd team

Tyrell Price – RB

Malcolm White – OL

Bingo Morton – WR

Defense

1st team

Isaiah Mack – DL

2nd team

Kareem Orr – DB

Specialists

1st team

Brandon Dowdell – RS

Schedule

Game summaries

Tennessee Tech

at The Citadel

at UT Martin

Samford

at East Tennessee State

Wofford

at Western Carolina

VMI

at Furman

Mercer

at South Carolina

Ranking movements

References

Chattanooga
Chattanooga Mocs football seasons
Chattanooga Mocs football